Anthu Inthu Preethi Banthu (Love Came Like That) is a 2008 Indian Kannada-language film directed by Veera Shankar. It stars debutante Aditya Babu and Ramya.  The film is a remake of the 2006 Telugu film Aadavari Matalaku Arthale Verule. Babu also produced the film. The film's title is based on the opening line of a song from Milana (2007).

Cast

 Aditya Babu as Shivu "Shiv Prakash" 
 Ramya as Preethi "Bhramarambike" 
 Harish Raj as Hari, Shivu's friend
 Srinivasa Murthy as Sathya prakash, Shivu's father
 Lokanath
 Rangayana Raghu as Veerabhadra 
 Chitra Shenoy
 Kuri Prathap as Sunil 
 Malathi Sardeshpande
 Shashikala 
 Kishori Ballal 
 Ramesh Pandith as Neelakantha 
 Mandya Ramesh as Thimma 
 Rajashekhar Naidu
 Madhu Hegde
 Satya
 Melkote
 Vithika Sheru
 Pakhi Hegde

Production
The film was shot in Hyderabad.

Soundtrack
The soundtrack features 7 songs overall, out of which 4 songs were retained from the Original Telugu soundtrack, composed by noted Tamil music director Yuvan Shankar Raja, while the remaining 3 were composed by Gurukiran. Lyrics were written by Kaviraj and Hrudaya Shiva. The soundtrack was released on 22 May 2008.

Reception
Film critic R. G. Vijayasarathy wrote that "A neat film that can be recommended for family audience".

References

2000s Kannada-language films
2008 films
Kannada remakes of Telugu films
Films scored by Gurukiran